François Paul Auguste Quinsac (2 March 1858, Bordeaux – May 1929, Bordeaux) was a French painter.

Quinsac was a painter of the French School known as Academic art, a specialist in mythological and allegorical subjects, figures and landscapes. He studied with Jean-Léon Gérôme and later he became professor at the School of Fine Arts of Bordeaux.

From 1880 he exhibited regularly to the Hall of the French Artists of which he became a member in 1887. He received an honourable mention during the exhibition of 1884, a medal of third class to the World Fair of 1889, as well as a travel grant. He was named Chevalier de la légion d’Honneur in 1903. He died in Bordeaux in May 1929, aged 71.

References

External links

Quinsac's painting Moulin de la Galette

1858 births
1929 deaths
Artists from Bordeaux
Chevaliers of the Légion d'honneur
19th-century French painters
French male painters
20th-century French painters
20th-century French male artists
19th-century French male artists